Jordan Alexander (born July 27, 1993) is a Canadian actress. She first gained recognition for starring in the Facebook Watch series Sacred Lies: The Singing Bones, prior to landing her breakout role as the lead character Julien Calloway in the HBO Max series reboot of Gossip Girl.

Life and career 
Jordan Alexander was born on July 23, 1993; she was born in Vancouver, British Columbia and was raised in Toronto, Ontario. Alexander is of German, Irish and mixed African-American heritage. In 2018, she released her debut album, The Lonely Hearts Club, and followed it by releasing the single "You", two years later.

In 2020, Alexander played Elsie/Maya on the second season of the Facebook Watch series Sacred Lies: The Singing Bones. She currently stars as private school student Julien Calloway in the season 7 reboot/revival of the teen drama television series Gossip Girl that originally began on The CW in 2007 and is based on a teen young adult book series of the same name, which premiered on HBO Max in July 2021.

Gossip Girl has been cancelled as of 2023 and not renewed for a third season with HBO Max.

Personal life 
Alexander identifies as queer.

Filmography

References 

1993 births
Living people
Female models from Ontario
Canadian television actresses
21st-century Canadian actresses
Canadian LGBT actors
Canadian people of African-American descent
Canadian people of German descent
Canadian people of Irish descent
Queer actresses
Queer women
21st-century Canadian LGBT people